Allium flavescens is a Eurasian species of wild onion native to Bulgaria, Romania, Ukraine, European Russia, Western Siberia, Altay Krai, and Kazakhstan.

References

flavescens
Flora of Eastern Europe
Flora of temperate Asia
Plants described in 1879